Emanuel Kohút (born 21 July 1982) is a Slovak volleyball player, former member of the Slovakia men's national volleyball team. On club level, he plays for Slovak team Spartak UJS Komarno.

Sporting achievements

Clubs
 CEV Champions League
  2012/2013 – with Bre Banca Lannutti Cuneo

 National championships
 2003/2004  Slovak Cup, with VKP Bratislava
 2003/2004  Slovak Championship, with VKP Bratislava
 2005/2006  Slovak Championship, with VKP Bratislava
 2006/2007  Slovak Cup, with VKP Bratislava

Individual awards
 2007: European League – Best Blocker 
 2017: Best Volleyball Player in Slovakia

References

External links
 
 Player profile at LegaVolley.it
 Player profile at PlusLiga.pl 
 Player profile at WorldofVolley.com
 Player profile at Volleybox.net 

1982 births
Living people
Sportspeople from Bratislava
Slovak men's volleyball players
Slovak expatriate sportspeople in Germany
Expatriate volleyball players in Germany
Slovak expatriate sportspeople in Italy
Expatriate volleyball players in Italy
Slovak expatriate sportspeople in Poland
Expatriate volleyball players in Poland
Czarni Radom players
GKS Katowice (volleyball) players